Nezhilovka is a rural locality (a village) in Muromsky District, Vladimir Oblast, Russia. The population was 209 as of 2010.

Geography 
Nezhilovka is located 6 km northwest of Murom. Murom is the nearest rural locality.

References 

Rural localities in Muromsky District